South Hams is a local government district on the south coast of Devon, England. Services divide between those provided by its own Council headquartered in Totnes, and those provided by Devon County Council headquartered in the city of Exeter.

Beside Totnes are its towns of Dartmouth, Kingsbridge, Salcombe, and Ivybridge — the most populous with 11,851 residents, as at the 2011 Census.

To the north, it includes part of Dartmoor National Park, to the east borders Torbay, and to the west Plymouth. It contains some of the most unspoilt coastline on the south coast, including the promontories of Start Point and Bolt Head. The entire coastline, along with the lower Avon and Dart valleys, form most of the South Devon Area of Outstanding Natural Beauty. The South Hams, along with nearby Broadsands in Paignton, is the last British refuge of the cirl bunting.

History
The South Hams were formerly part of the Brythonic (Celtic) Kingdom of Dumnonia later reduced to the modern boundary at the River Tamar as Cornwall presumably during the tenth-century reign of Æthelstan. Post-Roman settlement on coastal promontory hillforts, such as Burgh Island, follows the established pattern of trading—of tin in particular—found across the western, so-called 'Celtic', Atlantic coastal regions. In the later Anglo-Saxon era, the South Hams was a feudal estate consisting of all of the land between the River Plym and River Dart and south of Dartmoor with the English Channel forming the southern boundary. There is some evidence that Cornish was spoken and understood in the area until the late Middle Ages.

In 1917, the village of Hallsands was abandoned after much of it was lost to the sea. This happened because the shingle bank protecting the shore was removed to help build Devonport dockyard.

In 1944 several villages were evacuated so that training for D-Day could be carried out in secret. The area was chosen because of the resemblance of its beaches to those of Normandy. Preparations were disrupted, and secrecy nearly compromised, by a devastating E-boat attack during Exercise Tiger. In 1967, the suburban towns of Plympton and Plymstock were amalgamated with the City of Plymouth.

The current district was formed on 1 April 1974, under the Local Government Act 1972, by the merger of:
 Borough of Dartmouth
 Borough of Totnes
 Kingsbridge Rural District
 Kingsbridge Urban District
 Plympton St Mary Rural District
 Salcombe Urban District
 Totnes Rural District

In the 2016 EU Referendum it voted to remain with a very high (80.3%) turnout.

Geography
Geography divides into three unequal, fuzzy bands, one with bays, headlands, the birdlife, fishing and small harbour towns' estuaries and rias; an unequal wide-ranging elevations middle band with the main, well-conserved towns and; a sparsely populated, upland National Park moorland in the north.  For over a century its tourism was concentrated around the railway, with most stations built here from 1847 to 1872 so tourism to its beaches and fishing villages began in earnest much later than to the 'English Riviera' east of the area.  South Hams' widespread tourism multiplied on the dualling of the A38 and time-cutting construction of the M5 and A303 across other parts of south-west England.

Note: The aforementioned Brixham and Churston are geographically within neighbouring Torbay but were part of the South Hams Parliamentary constituency.

Settlements
  Ash, Aish, Allaleigh, Ashprington, Aveton Gifford
 Badworthy, Bantham, Beesands, Beeson, Berry Pomeroy, Bickleigh, Bigbury-on-Sea, Bittaford, Blackawton, Blackpool, Bolberry, Brixton, Broadhempston, Buckland-Tout-Saints
 Charleton, Chillington, Chivelstone, Churchstow, Cornwood, Cornworthy, Curtisknowle
 Dartington, Dartmouth, Dean Prior, Didworthy, Diptford, Dittisham, Dodbrooke (neighbourhood of Kingsbridge)
 East Allington, East Charleton, East Portlemouth, East Prawle, Ermington
 Ford (Chivelstone), Ford (Holbeton), Frogmore
 Goveton
 Hallsands, Halwell, Harberton, Harford, Hemsford, Heybrook Bay, Holbeton, Holne, Hutcherleigh
 Ivybridge
 Kingsbridge, Kingston, Kingswear
 Landscove, Ledstone, Lee Moor, Littlehempston, Loddiswell, Lutton
 Malborough, Marldon, Michelcombe, Modbury, Moreleigh
 Newton Ferrers, Noss Mayo, North Huish
 Rattery, Revelstoke, Rew, Ringmore, Roborough
 Salcombe, Scorriton, Shaugh Prior, Sherford (near Kingsbridge), Sherford (new town), Slapton, Soar, South Brent, South Huish, South Milton, South Pool, Sparkwell, Start, Staverton, Stoke Fleming, Stoke Gabriel, Stokenham, Sutton
 Thurlestone, Torcross, Totnes, Tuckenhay, The Mounts
 Ugborough, Uphempston
 Washbourne, Wembury, West Alvington, Woodleigh, Woolston Green, Wotter, Wrangaton
 Yealmpton

Politics

The South Hams is represented in the House of Commons by two parliamentary constituencies. The constituencies however do not represent the borders of the South Hams. Sir Gary Streeter and Anthony Mangnall represent the constituencies of South West Devon and Totnes respectively.

In South Hams, most councillors who are elected have been nominated by one of England's major political parties, although there have also been a small number of independents in previous elections. As of the 7 May 2015 election, the majority of councillors in the council are Conservatives. Up until 1983, the council was governed by independent councillors, before the Conservatives gained a majority in 1987; a position which has since been held (excluding a brief period where they lost control between 1995–99).

Electoral wards
The district of South Hams is divided into 20 wards, each returning between one and three councillors. Some wards are coterminous with civil parishes, though most consist of multiple parishes or parts of parishes. The following table lists the electoral wards of South Hams and the associated civil parishes.

Responsibilities for services
South Hams along with Devon County Council and 61 town and parish councils operate a three-tier system of local government. Devon County Council is responsible for larger issues such as education, highways and social services. South Hams District Council and Devon CC are jointly responsible for community transport, economic development, emergency planning, environmental protection, museums and arts, recycling, street lighting and tourism. More minor responsibilities are held by just the district council and/or the town and parish councils. Some of these responsibilities include car parks, litter, public toilets and waste collection. In order to reduce waste and injuries to the public, the council offer seagull-proof sacks as form of waste management.

See also
 Grade I listed buildings in South Hams
 Grade II* listed buildings in South Hams

Notes

References

External links
South Hams District Council
south-hams

 
Non-metropolitan districts of Devon